Daniel Abraham (born 11 March 1981) is an Australian former professional rugby league footballer who previously played for the Newcastle Knights and North Queensland Cowboys of the National Rugby League.

Background
Born in Belmont, New South Wales, Abraham played his junior football for the Booragul-Teralba Bears and Valentine-Eleebana Red Devils before being signed by the Newcastle Knights.

Playing career
In Round 9 of the 2000 NRL season, he made his NRL debut for the Knights against the Penrith Panthers. After playing just 15 games in the NRL, Abraham came off the bench in Newcastle's 2001 NRL Grand Final win against the Parramatta Eels. Having won the 2001 NRL Premiership, the Knights traveled to England to play the 2002 World Club Challenge against Super League champions, the Bradford Bulls. Abraham played at second-row forward in Newcastle's loss. In 2008, Abraham joined the North Queensland Cowboys for a season.

In 2009, Abraham played for the Mackay Cutters in the Queensland Cup. He scored 162 points for the Cutters before leaving the club at the end of the season. In 2010, Abraham returned to Newcastle to play for the Knights' NSW Cup reserve-grade team, the Central Coast Centurions. In 2011, Abraham returned to his junior club Kurri Kurri and captained the team in 2011 and 2012. In September 2012, Abraham played for the Newcastle Knights NSW Cup reserve-grade team in their qualifying finals match against the North Sydney Bears after being rung by coach Rip Taylor.

Representative career
In 2003, Abraham was selected for the Country Origin team. He was again selected in 2004.

References

External links
rleague.com Profile

1981 births
Living people
Australian rugby league players
Newcastle Knights players
North Queensland Cowboys players
Country New South Wales Origin rugby league team players
Central Coast Centurions players
Kurri Kurri Bulldogs players
Mackay Cutters players
Rugby league second-rows
Rugby league locks
Rugby league five-eighths
Rugby league players from Newcastle, New South Wales
Valentine-Eleebana Red Devils players